Sex, Drugs and Self-Control is the sixth album by rapper John Reuben, released on December 22, 2009.

Track listing
"Jamboree"
"Radio Makes You Lonely"
"Burn It Down"
"In the Air"
"Paranoid Schizophrenic Apocalyptic Whisper Kitten"
"Town Folk"
"Confident"
"Everett"
"No Be Nah"
"So Sexy for All the Right Reasons"
"Wooden Whistle Man"
"Joyful Noise"
"20 Something" (**Digital Exclusive)
"Come On Jamboree When Radio Makes You Lonely" (**Digital Exclusive)

Awards

The album was nominated for a Dove Award for Rap/Hip-Hop Album of the Year at the 42nd GMA Dove Awards, while the song "No Be Nah" was nominated for Rap/Hip-Hop Recorded Song of the Year.

References

2009 albums
John Reuben albums
Gotee Records albums